The Justice and Security (Northern Ireland) Act 2007 (c 6) is an Act of the Parliament of the United Kingdom. Its purpose is to facilitate security normalisation in Northern Ireland.

Section 8 - Supplementary
Section 8(4) extended section 4 of the Terrorism (Northern Ireland) Act 2006.

Section 53 - Commencement
Orders made under section 53(4):
The Justice and Security (Northern Ireland) Act 2007 (Commencement No.1 and Transitional Provisions) Order 2007 (S.I. 2007/2045 (C.76))
The Justice and Security (Northern Ireland) Act 2007 (Commencement No.2) Order 2007 (S.I. 2007/3069 (C.121))
The Justice and Security (Northern Ireland) Act 2007 (Commencement No.3) Order 2009 (S.I. 2009/446 (C.29))

Schedule 1 (suspension of Jury trial)
Schedule 1 suspended the jury trial in favor of a bench trial in relation to Northern Ireland; the so-called Diplock courts.

References
Halsbury's Statutes,

External links
The Justice and Security (Northern Ireland) Act 2007, as amended from the National Archives.
The Justice and Security (Northern Ireland) Act 2007, as originally enacted from the National Archives.
Explanatory notes to the Justice and Security (Northern Ireland) Act 2007.

United Kingdom Acts of Parliament 2007
Acts of the Parliament of the United Kingdom concerning Northern Ireland
2007 in Northern Ireland